This is a list of women writers who were born in Guatemala or whose writings are closely associated with that country.

A
Angelina Acuña (1905–2006), poet specializing in the classical sonnet form 
Isabel de los Ángeles Ruano (born 1945), novelist, poet, journalist
Margarita Azurdia (1931–1998), painter, sculptor, poet
Ana Maria Rodas (1937), poet, narrator and essayist, is considered one of the great figures

C
Margarita Carrera (1929–2018), poet, essayist, academic
Rosina Cazali (born 1960), art critic, columnist
Ana Cofiño (born 1955), researcher, anthropologist, editor, and historian

D
Margaret A. Dix (born 1939), Jersey-born botanist, educator, scientific works on biology and the environment
Marta Yolanda Díaz-Durán, journalist, educator

G
Natalia Górriz (1868–?), biographer, non-fiction writer, pedagogue
María Josefa García Granados (1796–1848), poet, journalist, early feminist

H
Elisa Hall de Asturias (1900–1982) author, feminist

L
Alcina Lubitch Domecq (born 1953), short story writer, now living in Israel

M
Rigoberta Menchú (born 1959), Nobel Peace Prize winner, autobiographer
Lucrecia Méndez (born 1943), educator, essayist, art critic
Luisa Moreno (1907–1992), civil rights activist, pamphlet writer
Lucrecia Méndez (born 1943), academic, literary critic
Luz Méndez de la Vega (1919–2012) feminist writer, poet, journalist, academic, actress

P
Dina Posada (born 1946), acclaimed Salvadoran-Guatemalan poet

R
Ana María Rodas (born 1937), journalist, poet

S
Magdalena Spínola, (1896–1991) poet, journalist, teacher

T
Aida Toledo (born 1952), poet, short story writer, educator

V
Vania Vargas (born 1978), poet, narrator, editor and cultural journalist

Z
Carol Zardetto, contemporary novelist, theatre critic, author of Con pasión absoluta (2007)

See also
List of women writers
List of Spanish-language authors

References

-
Guatemalan women writers, List of
Women writers, List of Guatemalan
Writers